The S86 was a line number used by the Berlin S-Bahn.

A Line with many Routes
This line number has been associated with four different routes during the last fifteen years. In June 1991, the line commenced service between Warschauer Straße and Buch. The line was altered in May 1993 to run between Pankow and Hauptbahnhof (now Ostbahnhof). The line was completed removed in May 1994.

The line re-appeared as a night-time shuttle between Hermannstraße and Spindlersfeld in December 1999 before being removed again in June 2002. The line was re-introduced temporarily during construction works between September 2005 and May 2006.

Warschauer Straße to Buch
This service ran for two years and provided an increased daytime service between Warschauer Straße and Buch. The line was extensively altered in May 1993 which effectively removed most of this service. The station listing below provides an overview of what the line looked like. The possible travel connections are correct for the period of operation and do not reflect the current travel connections for these stations.

 Warschauer Straße(S3) (S5) (S6) (S7) (S75) (S9)
 Ostkreuz (S3) (S5) (S6) (S7) (S75) (S8) (S85) (S9) (S10)
 Frankfurter Allee (U5)
 Storkower Straße
 Landsberger Allee
 Greifswalder Straße
 Prenzlauer Allee
 Schönhauser Allee (U2)
 Bornholmer Straße (S1) (S2)
 Pankow
 Pankow-Heinersdorf
 Blankenburg (S85) (S10)
 Karow (DB)
 Buch (S8)

Hauptbahnhof to Pankow
In May 1993, the line was extended by one station to the Hauptbahnhof (now Ostbahnhof) with the northern section cut back to Pankow. This revised line existed for a single year when the line disappeared off the maps for a period of five years. The station listing below provides an overview of what the line looked like. The possible travel connections are correct for the period of operation and do not reflect the current travel connections for these stations.

 Hauptbahnhof (now Ostbahnhof) (S3) (S5) (S6) (S7) (S9)
 Warschauer Straße (S75)
 Ostkreuz (S3) (S5) (S6) (S7) (S75) (S8) (S9) (S10)
 Frankfurter Allee (U5)
 Storkower Straße
 Landsberger Allee
 Greifswalder Straße
 Prenzlauer Allee
 Schönhauser Allee (U2)
 Bornholmer Straße (S1) (S2)
 Pankow (S8) (S10)

S86: Night Line
In December 1999, the line re-appeared as a night-time shuttle service between Spindlersfeld and Hermannstraße. This short line ran between 9pm and 4am to provide Spindlersfeld with a link to the network when the (S85) finished for the night. The line lasted until June 2002 when the new (S47) line started serving Spindlersfeld both day and night rendering the S86 obsolete. The station listing below provides an overview of what the line looked like. The possible travel connections are correct for the period of operation and do not reflect the current travel connections for these stations.

 Spindlersfeld
 Oberspree
 Schöneweide (S45) (S46) (S6) (S8) (S9) (DB)
 Baumschulenweg (S6) (S8) (S9)
 Köllnische Heide
 Neukölln (U7) (S4)
 Hermannstraße (U8) (S4) (S45) (S46)

Nordbahnhof to Birkenwerder
During major construction works at Pankow station and in the north–south tunnel between September 2005 and May 2006, the S86 operated between Nordbahnhof and Birkenwerder to maintain a service to the outer railway ring stations. The line joined with the (S26) at Nordbahnhof for 3 weeks to provide a through service to Teltow Stadt from 8 May 2006 until 27 May 2006. The possible travel connections are correct for the period of operation and do not reflect the current travel connections for these stations.

 Nordbahnhof (S1) (S2) (S25)
 Humboldthain
 Gesundbrunnen (U8) (S4x) (S45) (S46) (S47)
 Bornholmer Straße (S1) (S25) (S8) (S85)
 Pankow (U2)
 Pankow-Heinersdorf
 Blankenburg (S2)
 Mühlenbeck-Mönchmühle
 Schönfließ
 Bergfelde
 Hohen Neuendorf (S1)
 Birkenwerder (S1)

External links
  Berliner Verkehr Netzspinnen, Line Maps for every routing of the S86.
  S-Bahn Berlin News Release, News Release promoting Teltow Stadt to Birkenwerder routing without changing in May 2006 from March 2006.

Berlin S-Bahn lines